Norman Sidney Cooley (born 16 January 1941) is a former English cricketer.  Cooley was a right-handed batsman who fielded as a wicket-keeper.  He was born in Meppershall, Bedfordshire.

Cooley made his debut for Bedfordshire against Hertfordshire in the 1962 Minor Counties Championship.  He played Minor counties cricket for Bedfordshire from 1962 to 1975, making 59 Minor Counties Championship appearances.  He made his List A debut against Northamptonshire in the 1972 Gillette Cup.  He made four further List A appearances, the last of which came against Lancashire in the 1973 Gillette Cup.  In his five List A matches, he scored 58 runs at an average of 14.50, with a high score of 20 not out.

Cooley had another string to his bow, as one of the few to have successfully combined a cricketing with a footballing career. He played 738 games for Bedford Town FC in the Southern League between 1960 and 1977, scoring a career total of 73 goals, and later served as the club's youth coach. Moreover, his brother John played rugby union for Northampton, Bedford and East Midlands.

References

External links

1941 births
Living people
People from Central Bedfordshire District
English cricketers
Bedfordshire cricketers
Wicket-keepers